Vojníkov is a municipality and village in Písek District in the South Bohemian Region of the Czech Republic. It has about 100 inhabitants.

Administrative parts
Villages of Držov and Louka are administrative part of Vojníkov.

Geography
It lies in the Tábor Uplands. The municipality is situated on the right banks of the Otava River, which forms the western municipal border.

History
The first written mention of Vojníkov and Držov is from 1542, Louka was first mentioned in 1323.

References

Populated places in Písek District